Colleen Egan was an Assistant Editor at The West Australian newspaper. She played a role in obtaining the acquittal of Andrew Mallard, a Western Australian man who had been wrongfully convicted of murder. She also unwittingly contributed to the political downfall of Western Australian Liberal powerbroker Noel Crichton-Browne when he made inappropriate sexual comments to her at a Liberal Party conference.

History
Egan, who has principally been employed as a print journalist by The Sunday Times, first established herself as an investigative journalist in 2000 when her exclusive interviews with terrorist Jack Roche were published in The Australian. Her work has since taken her to London, covering trials at the Old Bailey, and back to Perth as a weekly columnist for The Sunday Times. She is now Chief of Staff for WA Attorney General John Quigley.

Egan was approached in 1998 by the family of Andrew Mallard who had been convicted and detained in 1995 for the murder of jeweller Pamela Lawrence. Her subsequent investigations revealed that Mallard's conviction had been largely based on a forced confession. Her book on the case, Murderer No More: Andrew Mallard and the Epic Fight that Proved his Innocence, was published by Allen & Unwin in June 2010.

Awards
Walkley Award for Most Outstanding Contribution to Journalism for 2006 for her role in the acquittal of Andrew Mallard.
News Limited's 2007 Sir Keith Murdoch Award for Journalism, also for the eight-year investigation that led to the acquittal of Andrew Mallard.
2011, Davitt Award for Murderer No More

See also
 Estelle Blackburn

References

External links
Transcript from Radio National Media Report programme, featuring interview with Colleen Egan (Broadcast on Thursday, 10 August 1995).
Walkley Awards website page for Colleen Egan

Australian columnists
Living people
Journalists from Western Australia
Walkley Award winners
Date of birth missing (living people)
Year of birth missing (living people)
Australian non-fiction crime writers